Muhammad Abbas was a Regent of Kano and later Emir of Kano. 
He was appointed regent by Lord Lugard after the pacification of Northern Nigeria, he presided over the transformation of the Caliphal Emirate into an Emirate subject to the British throne under the Protectorate of Northern Nigeria.

Early life

Little is known about the early life of Muhammad Abbas. During the Third Kanoan civil war, he was loyal to his brothers and later became the Wambai of Kano after Aliyu Babba led the Yusufawa to victory.
He escorted Aliyu Babba to Sokoto for the autumn campaign of 1903, when Kano was captured by the British. After the Battle of Kwatarkwashi, he led section of the Kanoan force to surrender to Lugard, for his loyalty, Lugard appointed him Regent of Kano and in May 1903 confirmed him as the Emir of Kano.

References

History of Northern Nigeria
Emirs of Kano